Gaspard Lemaire (1899 – 1979) was a Belgian swimmer. He competed in the men's 100 metre backstroke event at the 1920 Summer Olympics.

References

External links
 

1899 births
1979 deaths
Olympic swimmers of Belgium
Swimmers at the 1920 Summer Olympics
Swimmers from Antwerp
Belgian male backstroke swimmers